is a professional Japanese baseball player. He plays pitcher for the Orix Buffaloes.

References 

1998 births
Living people
Baseball people from Saitama Prefecture
Sendai University alumni
Nippon Professional Baseball pitchers
Orix Buffaloes players
People from Koshigaya, Saitama
Japanese people of Filipino descent
2023 World Baseball Classic players